Joseph McIlvaine (October 2, 1769August 19, 1826) was a United States senator from New Jersey from 1823 until his death. He served as the Mayor of Burlington, New Jersey.

Biography

McIlvaine was born in Bristol, Pennsylvania to Col. Joseph Mcllvaine (1749–1787) and Catherine Swan. His father's sister, Mary McIlvaine (1752–1818), married Joseph Bloomfield, later Governor of New Jersey. 
 
After pursuing an academic course and studying law, he was admitted to the bar of New Jersey in 1790 and commenced practice in Burlington, New Jersey in 1791.

He was clerk of Burlington County, New Jersey from 1796 to 1800; clerk of the Burlington County Court from 1800 to 1823; and U.S. Attorney for the District of New Jersey from 1804 to 1820. He was appointed as a judge to the New Jersey Superior Court in 1818, but declined.

He was elected to the United States Senate to fill the vacancy caused by the resignation of Samuel L. Southard and served from November 12, 1823, until his death in Burlington, New Jersey, where he was buried at Saint Mary's Episcopal Churchyard.

Family

On September 19, 1793, McIlvaine married Maria Reed, daughter of Bowes Reed, Secretary of State of New Jersey, and niece of Joseph Reed, Continental Congressman and Governor of Pennsylvania. They had three children:
Bowes Reed McIlvaine b: 1794
Joseph McIlvaineIII b: c. 1796 in Burlington, New Jersey
Reverend Charles Pettit McIlvaine (1798–1873), Bishop of the  Episcopal Diocese of Ohio
Bloomfield McIlvaine b: c. 1799 d-1826 in Burlington, New Jersey
Henry McIlvaine: c. 1805 in Burlington, New Jersey
William McIlvaine b: c. 1806
Emerson McIlvaine b: c. 1807
Edward McIlvaine b: c. 1808
Mary McIlvaine b: c. 1809
Ellen McIlvaine b: c. 1810

See also

List of United States Congress members who died in office (1790–1899)

References

External links

Joseph McIlvaine at The Political Graveyard

1769 births
1826 deaths
People from Bristol, Pennsylvania
New Jersey Democratic-Republicans
New Jersey National Republicans
United States senators from New Jersey
United States Attorneys for the District of New Jersey
New Jersey lawyers
People from Burlington, New Jersey
Democratic-Republican Party United States senators
Mayors of Burlington, New Jersey
Reed family (Pennsylvania and New Jersey)
19th-century American lawyers